Pachycallida is a genus of beetles in the family Carabidae, containing the following species:

 Pachycallida amplicollis (Fairmaire, 1899)
 Pachycallida rufoplagiata Jeannel, 1949
 Pachycallida sambiranensis Jeannel, 1949

References

Lebiinae